Strangers in the Night is a 1966 studio album by Frank Sinatra. It marked Sinatra's return to number one on the pop album charts in the mid-1960s, and consolidated the comeback he initiated in 1965. Combining pop hits with show tunes and standards, the album bridges classic jazz-oriented big band with contemporary pop. It became Sinatra's fifth and final album to reach number one on the US Pop Albums Chart. Additionally, the single "Strangers in the Night" reached number one on the pop single charts, while "Summer Wind" has become one of Sinatra best-known songs, making numerous film and television appearances in the years since its release.

At the Grammy Awards of 1967 Sinatra garnered two Grammys for his efforts on this album, including the Record of the Year for the title track, as well as Best Male Vocal Performance for the same song. (He also won a further Grammy that same year, the Album of the Year for A Man and His Music). Ernie Freeman's arrangement of the title track won him the Grammy Award for Best Arrangement Accompanying a Vocalist or Instrumentalist, and Eddie Brackett and Lee Herschberg's engineering earned them the Grammy Award for Best Engineered Album, Non-Classical.

This is the final album Sinatra performed with long-time arranger/conductor Nelson Riddle and his orchestra.

Strangers in the Night has been certified platinum for one million copies sold in the US. Aside from his Christmas output, it remains Sinatra's only solo studio album to achieve this certification to date.

On 26 January 2010 the album was reissued as a "Deluxe Edition" which included three bonus tracks (two recorded tracks of "Strangers in the Night" and "All or Nothing at All" performed at the Budokan Hall from 1985, and an alternate take of "Yes Sir, That's My Baby"). In this 2010 version the audio channels are inverted.

Track listing

Chart positions

Complete personnel
Frank Sinatra – vocals
The Nelson Riddle Orchestra
Nelson Riddle – arranger, conductor
Glen Campbell – guitar
Artie Kane – Hammond B3 organ

Track 1:
Vincent DeRosa, Henry Sigismonti, Gale Robinson, Richard Perissi (fr-h); Bill Green, Andreas Kostelas (fl); Sidney Sharp, Lennie Malarsky, William Kurasch, Ralph Schaeffer, Israel Baker, Arnold Belnick, Jerome Reisler, Robert SusheL John De Voogdt, Bernard Kundell, Tibor Zelig, Gerald Vinci, William Weiss, James Getzoff, Harry Bluestone, Victor Amo (vln); Harry Hyams, Joseph Di Fiore, Darrel Terwilliger, Alex Neiman (via); Joseph Saxon, Jesse Ehrlich, Emmet Sargeant, Armand Kaproff (vlc); Bill Miller, Michel Rubini (p); Alvin Casey, William Pitman, Glen Campbell, Tommy Tedesco (g); Chuck Berghofer (b); Hal Blaine (d); Eddie Brackett Jr., Emil Richards (perc). Ernie Freeman (arr); Donnie Lanier (cond).

Tracks 5, B2, B4, B5:

Pete Candoli, Don Fagerquist, Cappy Lewis, Ray Triscari (tpt); Dick Noel, Tommy Pederson, Tom Shepard (tbn); George Roberts (b-tbn); Chuck Gentry, Bill Green, Justin Gordon, Harry Klee, Ronny Lang (sax/wwd); Victor Amo, Israel Baker, Alex Beller, Herman Clebanoff, James Getzoff, Anatol Kaminsky, Ralph Schaeffer, Paul Shure, Gerald Vinci (vln); Stanley Harris, Paul Robyn (vla); Justin DiTullio, Elizabeth Greenschpoon, Armand Kaproff (vie); Bill Miller (p); Artie Kane (organ); Al Viola (g); Ralph Pefla (b); Irving Cottler (d); Emil Richards (perc); Nelson Riddle (cond).

Tracks 2, 3, 4, B1, B3:

Pete Candoli, Don Fagerquist, Cappy Lewis, Ray Triscari (tpt); Dick Noel, Tommy Pederson, Tom Shepard (tbn); George Roberts (b-tbn); Chuck Gentry, Bill Green, Justin Gordon, Harry Klee, Abe Most (sax/wwd); Victor Arno, Israel Baker, Alex Beller, Herman Clebanoff, James Getzoff, Anatol Kaminsky, Ralph Schaeffer, Paul Shure, Victor Bay (vln); Barbara Simons, Paul Robyn (via); Justin DiTullio, Elizabeth Greenschpoon, Armand Kaproff (vie); Bill Miller (p); Artie Kane (organ); Al Viola (g); Ralph Peña (b); Irving Cottler (d); Victor Feldman (perc); Nelson Riddle (cond).

Certifications, sales and awards

Grammy Awards

|-
|rowspan="4"| 
|rowspan="4"| "Strangers in the Night" ||Record of the Year|| 
|-
| Best Male Vocal Performance|| 
|-
|Best Arrangement, Instrumental and Vocals|| 
|-
|Best Engineered Album, Non-Classical||

References

Frank Sinatra albums
Reprise Records albums
1966 albums
Albums arranged by Nelson Riddle
Albums conducted by Nelson Riddle
Albums produced by Jimmy Bowen
Grammy Award for Best Engineered Album, Non-Classical